Scleroptila is a genus of birds in the francolin group of the tribe Gallini of the pheasant family. Its eight species range through Sub-Saharan Africa.

Species
The species are:

References

Further reading

 
Bird genera
Taxa named by Edward Blyth